John Fillmore Hayford (May 19, 1868 – March 10, 1925) was an eminent United States geodesist. His work involved the study of isostasy and the construction of a reference ellipsoid for approximating the figure of the Earth. The crater Hayford on the far side of the Moon is named after him. Mount Hayford, a 1,871 m mountain peak near Metlakatla, Alaska, United States, is named after him. A biography of Hayford may be found in the Biographical Memoirs of the National Academy of Sciences, 16 (5), 1935.

See also
Hayford ellipsoid

Bibliography

References

External links
National Academy of Sciences Biographical Memoir

1868 births
1925 deaths
American geodesists
People from Rouses Point, New York
Cornell University College of Engineering alumni
Mathematicians from New York (state)
Victoria Medal recipients